Oliva ornata is a species of sea snail, a marine gastropod mollusk in the family Olividae, the olives.

Description

Distribution
Western Australia.

References

ornata
Gastropods described in 1867